The 2020 United States House of Representatives elections in Connecticut was held on November 3, 2020, to elect the five U.S. representatives from the state of Connecticut, one from each of the state's five congressional districts. The elections coincided with the 2020 U.S. presidential election, as well as other elections to the House of Representatives, elections to the United States Senate and various state and local elections.

Overview

District 1

The 1st district encompasses Hartford and the surrounding areas. The incumbent is Democrat John B. Larson, who was re-elected with 63.9% of the vote in 2018.

Democratic primary

Candidates

Declared
 John B. Larson, incumbent U.S. Representative

Republican primary

Candidates

Declared
 Mary Fay, West Hartford town councilwoman
 James Griffin

Primary results

General election

Predictions

Results

District 2

The 2nd congressional district takes in eastern Connecticut including, Enfield, Norwich, New London, and Groton. The incumbent is Democrat Joe Courtney, who was re-elected with 62.2% of the vote in 2018.

Democratic primary

Candidates

Declared
 Joe Courtney, incumbent U.S. Representative

Republican primary

Candidates

Declared
 Justin Anderson, former Lieutenant Colonel of the Connecticut Army National Guard
 Tom Gilmer, commercial roofer, building project manager (withdrawn)

Primary results

General election

Predictions

Results

District 3

The 3rd district is located in the south central part of the state and takes in New Haven and its surrounding suburbs. The incumbent is Democrat Rosa DeLauro, who was re-elected with 64.6% of the vote in 2018.

Democratic primary

Candidates

Declared
 Rosa DeLauro, incumbent U.S. Representative

Republican primary

Candidates

Declared
 Margaret Streicker, real estate executive

General election

Predictions

Results

District 4

The 4th district is located in southwestern Connecticut, stretching from Greenwich to Bridgeport. The incumbent is Democrat Jim Himes, who was re-elected with 61.2% of the vote in 2018.

Democratic primary

Candidates

Declared
 Jim Himes, incumbent U.S. Representative

Republican primary

Candidates

Declared
 Jonathan Riddle, financial executive

General election

Predictions

Results

District 5

The 5th district is based in the northwestern region of the state, including the cities of Danbury, New Britain, Meriden, and most of Waterbury. The incumbent is Democrat Jahana Hayes, who was elected with 55.9% of the vote in 2018.

Democratic primary

Candidates

Declared
Jahana Hayes, incumbent U.S. Representative

Endorsements

Republican primary

Candidates

Declared
 David X. Sullivan, former assistant U.S. Attorney for the District of Connecticut

Withdrawn
 Pete Barresi, aircraft maintenance manager
 Robert F. Hyde, U.S. Marine Corps veteran
Ryan Meehan, businessman and military veteran
 Ruben Rodriguez, former Waterbury city plan commissioner and candidate for the Connecticut House of Representatives in 2014

General election

Predictions

Results

Notes

References

External links
 
 
  (State affiliate of the U.S. League of Women Voters)
 

Official campaign websites for 1st district candidates
 Mary Fay (R) for Congress
 John B. Larson (D) for Congress
 Tom McCormick (G) for Congress

Official campaign websites for 2nd district candidates
 Justin Anderson (R) for Congress
 Joe Courtney (D) for Congress
 Dan Reale (L) for Congress

Official campaign websites for 3rd district candidates
 Rosa DeLauro (D) for Congress
 Justin Paglino (G) for Congress
 Margaret Streicker (R) for Congress

Official campaign websites for 4th district candidates
 Jim Himes (D) for Congress
 Jonathan Riddle (R) for Congress 

Official campaign websites for 5th district candidates
 Jahana Hayes (D) for Congress
 David X. Sullivan (R) for Congress 

Connecticut
2020
House